Ruby Livingstone (born 12 March 1993) is a New Zealand professional racing cyclist. She races for Roxsolt Attaquer.

See also
 List of 2015 UCI Women's Teams and riders

References

External links

1993 births
Living people
New Zealand female cyclists
Place of birth missing (living people)
21st-century New Zealand women